Agonidae is a family of small, bottom-dwelling, cold-water marine fish. Common names for members of this family include poachers, Irish lords, sea ravens, alligatorfishes, starsnouts, hooknoses, and rockheads. They are notable for having elongated bodies covered by scales modified into bony plates, and for using their large pectoral fins to move in short bursts.  The family includes about 59 species in some 25 genera, some of which are quite widespread.

The pelvic fins are nearly vestigial, typically consisting of one small spine and a few rays.  The swim bladder is not present.

Agonidae species generally feed on small crustaceans and marine worms found on the bottom. Some species camouflage themselves with hydras, sponges, or seaweed. All but one species are restricted to the Northern Hemisphere.

Taxonomy
The family Agonidae was first proposed as a family in 1839 by the English naturalist William John Swainson. The Agonidae is classified within the superfamily Cottoidea in the suborder Cottoidei in the order Scorpaeniformes in the 5th edition of Fishes of the World but other authorities states that if Scorpaeniformes is excluded from Perciformes then Perciformes is recovered as paraphyletic and so classify this family within the infraorder Cottales within the suborder Cottoidei of the Perciformes. A number of taxa which were previously classified within the Cottidae were reclassified within the Agonidae which meant that the Cottidae was confined to the freshwater sculpins.

Subfamilies and genera
The Agonidae is divided into the following subfamilies and genera:
 Hemilepidontinae Jordan & Evermann, 1898
 Hemilepidotus Cuvier, 1829
 Hemitripterinae Gill, 1856
 Blepsias Cuvier, 1829
 Hemitripterus Cuvier, 1829
 Nautichthys Girard, 1858
 Bothragoninae Lindberg, 1971
 Bothragonus Gill, 1883
 Hypsagoninae Gill, 1861
 Agonomalus Guichenot, 1866
 Hypsagonus Gill, 1861
 Percis Scopoli, 1777
 Anoplagoninae Gill, 1861
 Anoplagonus Gill, 1861
 Aspidophoroides  Lacépède, 1801
 Brachyopsinae Jordan & Evermann, 1898
 Brachyopsis Gill, 1861
 Chesnonia Iredale & Whitley, 1969
 Occella Jordan & Hubbs, 1925
 Pallasina Cramer, 1895
 Stellerina Cramer, 1896
 Tilesina Schmidt, 1904
 Agoninae Swainson, 1839
 Agonopsis Gill, 1861
 Agonus Bloch & Schneider, 1801
 Freemanichthys Kanayama, 1991
 Leptagonus Gill, 1861
 Podothecus Gill, 1861
 Sarritor Cramer, 1896
 Bathyagoninae Lindberg, 1971
 Bathyagonus Gilbert, 1890
 Odontopyxis Lockington, 1880
 Xeneretmus Gilbert, 1903

References 

 
Cottoidea
Ray-finned fish families
Taxa described in 1839
Taxa named by William John Swainson